The Lems was an English electric car manufactured by the London Electromobile Syndicate in London from 1903 to 1904.  The two-seater runabout claimed to run  on a single charge and reach a top speed of 12 mph (19 km/h). It was sold for 180 guineas.

In the United States, there is an example of this car at Larz Anderson Auto Museum in Brookline, Massachusetts.

See also 
 List of car manufacturers of the United Kingdom

References
David Burgess Wise, The New Illustrated Encyclopedia of Automobiles.

Electric vehicles
Defunct motor vehicle manufacturers of England
Vehicle manufacture in London